Pachydrobiella brevis is a species of freshwater snail, an aquatic gastropod mollusk in the family Pomatiopsidae.

Pachydrobiella brevis is the only species in the genus Pachydrobiella.

Distribution
The distribution of Pachydrobiella brevis includes Khong Island in the Mekong River, southern Laos. The type locality is Khong Island. This species is probably endemic to the Khong Island region.

Description 
The shape of the shell is ovate-conic. The shell is thick and smooth. The smooth shell is unique in the tribe Jullieniini. The outer lip is thick with growth lines.

The width of the shell is 2.5 mm. The height of the shell is 2.2–3.6 mm.

Thiele (1928) and Brandt (1970) made a drawing showing smooth teeth in the radula, but Davis (1979) showed multiserrate teeth in the radula.

Ecology 
Pachydrobiella brevis lives primarily in freshwater habitats that lack a current or have only a slight current. However this species sometimes or rarely also lives also in places where the current is moderate  or strong all the way to whitewater.

This snail probably feeds on algae on stones.

References

External links 

Pomatiopsidae
Gastropods described in 1895